Richmond Yiadom Boakye (born 28 January 1993) is a Ghanaian professional footballer who plays as a striker for Libyan Premier League club Al Akhdar and the Ghana national team.

Club career

Early career
Born in Accra, Greater Accrai, Boakye began his career with Bechem United in his native country of Ghana. He eventually moved to Agogo, Asante Akim North District based club, D.C. United and remained until 2008 when he was scouted by Genoa C.F.C. following a tournament in Vicenza, Italy.

Genoa
Following his transfer to Genoa in 2009, Boakye spent the 2009–10 Serie A season, playing in the Campionato Nazionale Primavera for the Ligurian club. On 3 April 2010, Boakye made his Serie A debut, in a match against Livorno. He came off the bench as a substitute for David Suazo in the 13th minute and scored the opening goal, and the match ended in a 1–1 draw. On 2 May, he played in his second match, replacing Giuseppe Sculli as a 71st minute substitute. In the process he played often for Genoa's Primavera side, winning the Scudetto, Coppa Italia and two Supercoppa Primavera with the Rossoblu.

Sassuolo 
On 21 June 2011, Boakye officially joined Serie B outfit Sassuolo on a one-year loan deal that proved very successful for the Ghanaian; he managed to score 12 goals in 36 appearances for the club that missed promotion to Serie A via a promotion play-off loss on aggregate to U.C. Sampdoria during the 2011–12. His loan deal was extended for an extra year for the after signing for Juventus in 2012. The following season, the 2012–13, he scored 11 league goals in 32 league appearances, ended as the club's joint top scorer and helped them to win the Serie B thus achieving direct promotion to Serie A and ensuring a first top-flight campaign ever in the club's history for the 2013–14 season.

Juventus
His performances for the Neroverde did not go unnoticed, as the player was eventually signed by reigning Serie A champions Juventus F.C. on a co-ownership deal from Genoa in July 2012. After joining the club, however, he returned to Sassuolo on a second season-long loan deal with the club. Juventus paid nothing in cash but cancelled the transfer debt owed to Genoa with the sale of Ciro Immobile on a similar co-ownership deal in January 2012.

Boakye returned to Juventus on 30 June 2013 but was later loaned to Elche in Spain for the 2013–14 season. He finished the season having scored 6 goals in 31 league appearances (12 starts) for the Spanish club, and returned again to Juventus on 30 June 2014, after the co-ownership with Genoa was renewed just ten days prior.

Atalanta
On 21 July 2014, Genoa sold half of Boakye's 50% registration rights to Atalanta for €1.3 million, with Juventus retained the other half. On 23 June 2015, Atalanta bought Boakye outright from Juventus for €1.6 million.

On 31 August 2015, Boakye left for Dutch club Roda JC.

Latina
In January 2016, Boakye was sold to Latina in a temporary deal, with an obligation to sign outright at the end of season for an undisclosed fee.

Red Star Belgrade
In January 2017, he came on a year-and-a-half loan to a Serbian team Red Star Belgrade. Boakye impressed at Red Star Belgrade with his performances based the time he spent from January to May in the club. He scored an impressive 16 goals in 19 games in all competitions, and won the best player of the week on two occasions within the Serbian Superliga.

The season was marked by fierce rivalry between Red Star and Partizan and the owner of the trophy was decided only in the last round of the championship and ended up in Partizan hands, with Red Star finishing second. He made 18 appearances, spent 1375 minutes in game, and scored 16 goals. He was unable to fight for the league top scorer title as he arrived during winter break and missed the first half of the season. His great performances influenced Ghana national team coach James Kwesi Appiah to ask Boakye to join the Ghana national team as soon as he gets released by Red Star for summer holidays. Boakye also became a free agent on 29 May, after the bankruptcy of Latina.

Red Star Belgrade signed Boakye on a permanent deal on 27 June 2017. He started the season with 5 goals in the first 3 games of qualifying matches of the club in 2017–18 UEFA Europa League. He added two more goals in his fifth and sixth games of Europa League qualifying match appearances.

On 14 December 2017, he was elected by the direction board as the Red Star player of the year in 2017. His performances with Red Star attracted the interest of numerous foreign teams in the winter of 2017–18. Chelsea and their coach Antonio Conte had scouted him closely over the course of the 2017–18 winter transfer window.

Jiangsu Suning
On 27 February 2018, Boakye was transferred to Jiangsu Suning for a reported €5.5 million fee.

Return to Red Star Belgrade
On 31 August 2018, Boakye signed a new 2.5-year contract with an optional one-year extension for Red Star in a €2.5 million transfer, just six months after the transfer to Jiangsu Suning. He  contributed to Red Star's 2018-19 UEFA Champions League campaign, as the team qualified to the group stage for the first time after 27 years. After becoming the best foreigner goalscorer in the history of the club, Boakye became the first foreigner to wear a Red Star jersey over two separate terms. On 15 September 2018, he scored a brace against Radnik Surdulica in his first match since returning to Red Star. On 23 September 2018, he scored a header against Partizan in the eternal derby, which ended in a 1–1 tie.

Górnik Zabrze 
On 9 February 2021, Boakye signed a short-term contract with Polish football club Górnik Zabrze until the end of the 2020–21 season on a free transfer with an option to extend.

Beitar Jerusalem
On 20 July 2021, Boakye signed for Beitar Jerusalem.

International career
Boakye received an international call-up by the Ghana national team for the friendly match against China at the Tianhe Stadium in Guangzhou on 15 August 2012. Boakye scored his first goal for Ghana on his debut, an equaliser in the 80th minute of the match. He also played for Ghana at the 2013 FIFA U-20 World Cup, winning the bronze medal.

Personal life
Whilst on loan playing for Elche in the La Liga in 2013, Boakye revealed that he is Real Madrid fan even though when he was growing up everyone in his family supported Manchester United and Barcelona.

Career statistics

Club

International 

Scores and results list Ghana's goal tally first, score column indicates score after each Boakye goal.

Honours
Genoa Primavera
 Campionato Nazionale Primavera: 2009–10
 Coppa Italia Primavera: 2008–09
 Supercoppa Primavera: 2009, 2010Sassuolo Serie B: 2012–13Red Star BelgradeSerbian SuperLiga: 2017–18, 2018–19, 2019–20, 2020–21Ghana U20FIFA U-20 World Cup: third place 2013Individual' Serbian SuperLiga Player of the week: (2016–2017 Round 27 & 37)(2017–2018 Round 17 & 18) (2018–2019 Round 8)Večernje novosti'' captains' poll Serbian Super Liga Best Player award: 2017–18.
 Red Star Belgrade player of the year: 2017

References

External links

 
 
 "Richmond Boakye-Yiadom: Ghanaian striker rushed to hospital after collapsing in Serie B" (29 October 2016)
 "Richmond Boakye-Yiadom scores on Red Star Belgrade debut" (2 February 2017)

1993 births
Living people
Ghanaian footballers
Association football forwards
U.S. Sassuolo Calcio players
Genoa C.F.C. players
Juventus F.C. players
Elche CF players
Atalanta B.C. players
Roda JC Kerkrade players
Latina Calcio 1932 players
Jiangsu F.C. players
Red Star Belgrade footballers
Górnik Zabrze players
Beitar Jerusalem F.C. players
PAS Lamia 1964 players
Serie A players
Serie B players
La Liga players
Eredivisie players
Chinese Super League players
Serbian SuperLiga players
Ekstraklasa players
Israeli Premier League players
Super League Greece players
Expatriate footballers in Italy
Expatriate footballers in Spain
Expatriate footballers in the Netherlands
Expatriate footballers in China
Expatriate footballers in Serbia
Expatriate footballers in Poland
Expatriate footballers in Israel
Expatriate footballers in Greece
Ghanaian expatriate sportspeople in Italy
Ghanaian expatriate sportspeople in Spain
Ghanaian expatriate sportspeople in the Netherlands
Ghanaian expatriate sportspeople in China
Ghanaian expatriate sportspeople in Serbia
Ghanaian expatriate sportspeople in Poland
Ghanaian expatriate sportspeople in Israel
Ghanaian expatriate sportspeople in Greece
2013 Africa Cup of Nations players
2021 Africa Cup of Nations players
People from Agogo, Ghana
Ghana under-20 international footballers
Ghana international footballers
Ghanaian expatriate footballers